Gilbert du Motier, Marquis de Lafayette (1757–1834), a French aristocrat and Revolutionary War hero, was widely commemorated in the U.S. and elsewhere. Below is a list of the many homages and/or tributes named in his honor:

Honors

In 1792, James McHenry, whom Lafayette considered a good friend, purchased a tract called Ridgely's Delight about a mile west of Baltimore. On it, he built a country seat on 95 acres and named it Fayetteville in his honor.
In 1824, the U.S. government named Lafayette Park in his honor; it lies immediately north of the White House in Washington, D.C.
In 1824, Lafayette was invited back to the United States to commemorate the anniversary of the American Revolution, and visited the Battle of Yorktown battlefield.
In 1826, Lafayette College was chartered in Easton, Pennsylvania. Lafayette was honored with a monument in New York City in 1917. Portraits display Washington and Lafayette in the chamber of the U.S. House of Representatives. Numerous towns, cities, and counties across the United States were named in his honor.
In 1831, the French navy surgeon and naturalist René Primevère Lesson honored Lafayette by giving the Sri Lankan junglefowl the scientific name Gallus lafayetii. Hence the spelling lafayetii is considered a lapsus and the corrected spelling G. lafayettii is in common use.
In 1834, upon Lafayette's death, American President Andrew Jackson ordered that Lafayette be accorded the same funeral honors as John Adams and George Washington. Therefore, 24-gun salutes were fired from military posts and ships, each shot representing a U.S. state. Flags flew at half mast for thirty-five days, and "military officers wore crepe for six months". The Congress hung black in chambers and asked the entire country to dress in black for the next thirty days.
In 1899, Lafayette appeared with Washington on a U.S. coin, the Lafayette dollar that was minted in 1899 (though showing the year 1900). It was produced to raise money for a statue of him that was erected in Paris.
On July 4, 1917, shortly after the U.S. entered World War I, Colonel Charles E. Stanton visited the grave of Lafayette and uttered the famous phrase "Lafayette, we are here." After the war, a U.S. flag was permanently placed at the grave site. Every year, on Independence Day, the flag is replaced in a joint French-American ceremony. The flag remained even during the German occupation of Paris during World War II.
In 1943, on visiting Corsica, General George S. Patton commented on how the Free French forces had liberated the birthplace of Napoleon, and promised that the Americans would liberate the birthplace of Lafayette.
In 1958, the Order of Lafayette was established by U.S. Representative Hamilton Fish III, a World War I veteran, to promote Franco-American friendship and to honor Americans who fought in France. The frigate Hermione, in which Lafayette returned to America, has been reconstructed in the port of Rochefort, Charente-Maritime, France.
In 2002, although he became a naturalized American citizen during his lifetime, Lafayette was granted honorary United States citizenship by the United States Congress.
In 2020, President's Square was renamed Lafayette Square stemming from the Black Lives Matter movement's call of change for the sake of liberty as Lafayette had fought for.

Military and maritime
Several warships were named after Lafayette:
The French Navy acquired USS Langley in 1951 and renamed it La Fayette.
The French frigate La Fayette is a modern "stealth frigate" launched in 1992 and in use by the French Navy since 1996. It is the namesake of the La Fayette class of frigates.
The French ocean-liner SS Normandie was to be the troopship USS Lafayette after being acquired by the US Government, but was destroyed by a fire before conversion to the new role was completed. The name was later given to the USS Lafayette, the lead ship of the Lafayette Class of ballistic missile submarines.
The Lafayette Escadrille was an escadrille of the French Air Service during World War I composed largely of American volunteer pilots.

Places

Counties
Fayette County, Alabama
Fayette County, Georgia
Fayette County, Kentucky
Fayette County, Tennessee
Fayette County, Pennsylvania
Fayette County, West Virginia
Lafayette County, Arkansas
Lafayette County, Mississippi
Lafayette County, Florida
Lafayette Parish, Louisiana

Cities, towns, and villages 

 Fayetteville, North Carolina was the first city named after Lafayette, and is the only one he actually visited, arriving in Fayetteville by horse-drawn carriage in 1825 during Lafayette's visit to the United States from July 1824 to September 1825. Has the largest city population.
 Fayetteville, Georgia, seat of Fayette County
 Lagrange, Georgia, named for Lafayette's estate in France
 Fayetteville, New York
 Lafayette, Alabama
 Fayetteville, Tennessee is named indirectly; the city is named after Fayetteville, North Carolina.
 Fayetteville, Arkansas is named indirectly; the city is named after Fayetteville, TN, which in turn is named after Fayetteville, NC. Has the largest metropolitan population.
 Lafayette, California
 LaFayette, Georgia
 Lafayette, Indiana, seat of Tippecanoe County and the home of Purdue University, named after Lafayette during his tour of America.
 Lafayette, Louisiana
 LaFayette, New York
 LaGrange, New York

Squares
Lafayette Square in Buffalo, New York, where he spoke during his nationwide tour in 1825.
Lafayette Square in Saint Louis, Missouri, created in 1833 as one of the city's first public parks and named in his honor in 1854.
Lafayette Square, in Washington, D.C.
Lafayette Square, New Orleans, LA
Lafayette Square in LaGrange, Georgia

Streets
Rue La Fayette in Paris, one of the longest roads in the city, which crosses the 9th and 10th arrondissements of the city from southwest to northeast.
Lafayette Street in New Haven, Connecticut
Lafayette Street in Williston Park, New York
New York City 
Lafayette Avenue in Brooklyn
Lafayette Avenue in The Bronx
Lafayette Street in Manhattan
Lafayette Street in Queens
Lafayette Street in Staten Island
Lafayette Road in New Hampshire, which extends from the Massachusetts border in Seabrook to Portsmouth
Avenue de Lafayette in Boston, Massachusetts, located in the Downtown Crossing area.
Lafayette Avenue in Baltimore, Maryland
Lafayette Boulevard in Bridgeport, Connecticut
Lafayette Road in Harrington Park, New Jersey
Lafayette Road in Indianapolis, Indiana
Lafayette Street in Cape May, New Jersey
Lafayette Street in Waltham, Massachusetts, located near a critical area during the Revolution.
Ulice Lafayettova in Olomouc, Czech Republic, is near the site of Lafayette's imprisonment.
Lafayette Street in Metamora, Illinois
Lafayette Drive and Lafayette Road in Phoenixville, Pennsylvania, both off of Valley Forge Road located near Valley Forge.
Lafayette Boulevard in Fredericksburg, Virginia, located near the boyhood home of George Washington at Ferry Farm.
Lafayette Street in Marianna, Florida.

Schools
Lafayette High School (Alabama), in Lafayette, Alabama
 Lafayette High School (Georgia), in Lafayette, Georgia
 Lafayette High School (Florida), in Mayo, Florida
 Lafayette High School (Lexington, Kentucky), in Lexington, Kentucky
 Lafayette High School (Louisiana), in Lafayette, Louisiana
 Lafayette High School (St. Joseph, Missouri), in St. Joseph, Missouri
 Lafayette High School (Wildwood, Missouri), in Wildwood, Missouri
 Lafayette High School (New York City), in Brooklyn, New York
 Lafayette High School (Buffalo, New York), in Buffalo, New York
 Lafayette High School (Virginia), near Williamsburg, Virginia
 LaFayette Jr./Sr. High School (LaFayette, New York), in LaFayette, New York

Other Places
 Mount Lafayette in the White Mountains of New Hampshire.
Lafayetteville in Milan, New York
 Lafayette Park, a park and neighborhood in Fall River, Massachusetts
 Lafayette Park, a park in Watkins Glen, New York
LaGrange, Georgia, named for the Lafayettes' estate in France
Lafayette Park in San Francisco, California

Lafayette in sculpture

 Bust of Lafayette by Houdon, 1786, marble, in the rotunda of the Virginia State Capitol. 
 Bust of Lafayette in National Guard uniform by Houdon, 1790, marble, now at Gilcrease Museum, Tulsa, Oklahoma.
 Statue by Bartholdi in Union Square Park, Manhattan, New York, 1876
 Pediment on the Tippecanoe County Courthouse, Lafayette, Indiana, 1882 
 Lafayette on the Green, University of Vermont, 1883
 LaFayette Fountain by Lorado Taft in Lafayette, Indiana, 1887
 Statue in Lafayette Square, Washington, D.C., 1891.
 Statue of Lafayette and Washington by Bartholdi, Place des États-Unis (United States Plaza), Paris, France, 1895
 Equestrian statue by Paul Wayland Bartlett, 1908, Cours-la-Reine, Paris.  An early version appears on the Lafayette dollar.
Lafayette Memorial by Daniel Chester French, 1917, Prospect Park, Brooklyn.
 Equestrian statue by Paul Wayland Bartlett, Metz, France 1919, destroyed by German occupation forces and replaced by another statue by M . Goutin in 2004
 Statue of the Marquis de Lafayette on Lafayette College campus, Easton, Pennsylvania, by Daniel Chester French in 1921
Equestrian statue in front of the Washington Monument in Baltimore, Maryland, 1924
 Statue on Washington Street in Hartford, Connecticut, by Paul Wayland Bartlett. The original of this statue stands in the Louvre, a gift to France from the school children of the United States. 1957.
 Built in 1975, a statue of Lafayette stands atop a fountain in the courthouse square in LaGrange, Georgia.
 Statue of Lafayette on Union Avenue & Warren Street in Havre de Grace, Maryland, 1976
 Statue outside of the Gen. Horatio Gates House and Golden Plough Tavern, York, Pennsylvania, 2007
 Statue of Lafayette, Admiral de Grasse, and General Washington on the Riverwalk Landing in Yorktown, VA, added in 2017.
 Statue of the Marquis de Lafayette (Los Angeles)

Lafayette in Literature
Lydia Sigourney's tribute in poetry, To General Lafayette, was published in her 1827 collection of poems.

Gallery

References

Works cited 

 
 

Cultural depictions of Gilbert du Motier, Marquis de Lafayette
Lafayette, Gilbert Du Motier, (Formerly) Marquis De
Lafayette